The Canceled Mortgage is a 1915 drama film featuring Harry Carey.

Cast
 Harry Carey
 Claire McDowell
 Barney Furey
 Zoe Rae (as Zoe Bech)

See also
 List of American films of 1915
 Harry Carey filmography

External links

1915 films
Silent American drama films
American silent short films
American black-and-white films
1915 drama films
1915 short films
1910s American films